Hasanağa Bahçesi is a proposed underground station on the Üçyol—Çamlıkule Line of the İzmir Metro. It will be located beneath Erdem Avenue in Buca. Construction of the station, along with the metro line, is expected to begin in 2020. 

Hasanağa Bahçesi station is expected to open in 2024.

Nearby places of interest
Hasanağa Bahçesi
Old Buca Cemetery

References

İzmir Metro
Railway stations scheduled to open in 2024
Rapid transit stations under construction in Turkey